Sean Daniel O'Malley (born October 24, 1994) is an American professional mixed martial artist. He currently competes in the Bantamweight division in the Ultimate Fighting Championship (UFC). As of March 13, 2023, he is #2 in the UFC bantamweight rankings.

Mixed martial arts career

Early career 
O'Malley trains in Glendale, Arizona at The MMA Lab led by head trainer John Crouch, and is coached by his long time friend, Tim Welch.

O'Malley was given the nickname "Sugar" by one of his MMA coaches in Montana early on in his career.

O'Malley fought his first five fights of his career in his native Montana, before leaving to fight in North Dakota and eventually fought for Legacy Fighting Alliance where he got a highlight-reel knockout over David Nuzzo.

After his win over Nuzzo, O'Malley earned a spot on Dana White's Contender Series 2 when he took on Alfred Khashakyan. O'Malley beat Khashakyan with a stunning knockout in the first round and was awarded a UFC contract.

Ultimate Fighting Championship 
O'Malley's promotional debut came against Terrion Ware on December 1, 2017 at The Ultimate Fighter 26 Finale.  O'Malley won the fight via unanimous decision.

O'Malley next faced Andre Soukhamthath on March 3, 2018 at UFC 222. He won the fight by unanimous decision, despite injuring his foot in the third round. This fight earned both participants a Fight of the Night bonus.

O'Malley was expected to face José Alberto Quiñónez on October 6, 2018 at UFC 229. However, O'Malley announced that he was out of the fight on September 30 due to a potential Anti-Doping Policy violation. On October 25, O'Malley received hip surgery while waiting to receive judgment pending his potential violation. Subsequently, O'Malley was suspended for six months by the NSAC after testing positive for ostarine. He became eligible to return as of March 2019.

O'Malley was scheduled to face Marlon Vera on July 6, 2019 at UFC 239.   However, O'Malley announced his withdrawal from the bout on June 21, 2019 due to a failed test for ostarine.  The Nevada State Athletic Commission decided to suspend him due to the failed test and he was suspended for 6 months by USADA. The ostarine in his system was likely residual from his previously failed test prior to UFC 229.

O'Malley faced José Alberto Quiñónez at UFC 248 on March 7, 2020. He won the fight via TKO in the first round. This win earned him his first Performance of the Night award.

O'Malley faced former WEC Bantamweight Champion Eddie Wineland at UFC 250 on June 6, 2020. He won the fight via one-punch knockout in the first round.  This win earned him the Performance of the Night.

O'Malley faced Marlon Vera in the co-main event of UFC 252 on August 15, 2020. He would go on to lose the fight via TKO in round one. He was later diagnosed with drop foot, which was the result of a leg kick landed by Vera.

O'Malley faced Thomas Almeida on March 27, 2021 at UFC 260. During the first round O'Malley dropped Almeida with a punch, and walked away thinking that Almeida had been knocked unconscious. Despite this he won the fight via knockout in the third round. This win earned him the Performance of the Night award.

O'Malley was scheduled to face Louis Smolka on July 10, 2021  at UFC 264. However, Smolka pulled out of the fight in late June citing injury, and he was replaced by promotional newcomer Kris Moutinho. He won the bout via TKO in round three, after outstriking Moutinho with hard shots for all three rounds. This fight earned him the Fight of the Night award.

O'Malley faced Raulian Paiva on December 11, 2021 at UFC 269. He won the fight via TKO in round one. The win also earned O'Malley his fourth Performance of the Night bonus award.

O'Malley faced Pedro Munhoz on July 2, 2022, at UFC 276. Early in the second round, O'Malley accidentally poked Munhoz in the eye, rendering him unable to continue. The fight was declared a no contest.

O'Malley faced Petr Yan on October 22, 2022 at UFC 280. He won the bout via split decision. The result was seen as highly controversial, with many fans and fighters expressing their belief that Yan was the rightful winner. 25 out of 26 media outlets scored the fight for Yan. The bout received the Fight of the Night bonus.

Submission grappling

Quintet: Ultra 
O'Malley competed at Quintet: Ultra as a member of Team UFC on December 12, 2019. He submitted Takanori Gomi with a guillotine choke in his opening round of the tournament but was subsequently submitted by Héctor Lombard with an ankle-lock. The team advanced to the next round and faced Team Strikeforce. In that round, he went to a draw with former Strikeforce champion Gilbert Melendez, being both eliminated of the round. Team UFC ended up winning the tournament.

Grappling Industries 
O'Malley also entered the 155lbs Advanced No-gi division of Grappling Industries Phoenix on September 20, 2020 and placed third in a seven-man division, only losing to the eventual winner, Robert Degle.

Submission Underground 
Chael Sonnen put out an open challenge on behalf of O'Malley for his promotion's event on December 20, 2020. The challenge was answered by James Gallagher, who challenged O'Malley to a grappling match at the SUG event. O'Malley reportedly declined the matchup and Gallagher was left without an opponent.

Personal life
O'Malley's grandmother is Irish.

Together with his friend and head coach, Tim Welch, O'Malley is a co-host of their own podcast, The Timbo Sugarshow. O'Malley has been an endorsed athlete of prominent combat sports brand Sanabul since 2017.  He was previously following a vegan diet but has since gone back to incorporating meat into what he eats.

O'Malley is an advocate for legalizing marijuana.

O'Malley is currently in an open relationship with his wife.

In late 2020, O'Malley and his wife Danya had a daughter named Elena.

Championships and accomplishments
Ultimate Fighting Championship
Fight of the Night (Three times) 
Performance of the Night (Four times) 
Tied (Pedro Munhoz) for second most post-fight bonuses in UFC Bantamweight division history (7)
Intense Championship Fighting
ICF Bantamweight Championship (One time)

Mixed martial arts record

|-
|Win
|align=center|16–1 (1)
|Petr Yan
|Decision (split)
|UFC 280
|
|align=center|3
|align=center|5:00
|Abu Dhabi, United Arab Emirates
|
|-
|NC
|align=center|15–1 (1)
|Pedro Munhoz
|NC (accidental eye poke)
|UFC 276
| 
|align=center|2
|align=center|1:51
|Las Vegas, Nevada, United States
|
|-
|Win
|align=center|15–1
|Raulian Paiva
|TKO (punches) 
|UFC 269
|
|align=center|1
|align=center|4:42
|Las Vegas, Nevada, United States
|
|-
|Win
|align=center|14–1
|Kris Moutinho
|TKO (punches)
|UFC 264
|
|align=center|3
|align=center|4:33
|Las Vegas, Nevada, United States
|
|-
|Win
|align=center|13–1
|Thomas Almeida
|KO (punch)
|UFC 260 
|
|align=center|3
|align=center|3:52
|Las Vegas, Nevada, United States
|
|-
|Loss
|align=center|12–1
|Marlon Vera
|TKO (elbows and punches)
|UFC 252
|
|align=center|1
|align=center|4:40
|Las Vegas, Nevada, United States
|
|-
|Win
|align=center|12–0
|Eddie Wineland
|KO (punch)
|UFC 250
|
|align=center|1
|align=center|1:54
|Las Vegas, Nevada, United States
|
|- 
|Win
|align=center|11–0
|José Alberto Quiñónez
|TKO (head kick and punches)
|UFC 248
|
|align=center|1
|align=center|2:02
|Las Vegas, Nevada, United States
|
|- 
|Win
|align=center|10–0
|Andre Soukhamthath
|Decision (unanimous)
|UFC 222 
|
|align=center|3
|align=center|5:00
|Las Vegas, Nevada, United States
|
|-
|Win
|align=center|9–0
|Terrion Ware
|Decision (unanimous)
|The Ultimate Fighter: A New World Champion Finale
|December 1, 2017
|align=center|3
|align=center|5:00
|Las Vegas, Nevada, United States
|
|-
|Win
|align=center|8–0
|Alfred Khashakyan
|KO (punch)
|Dana White's Contender Series 2
|July 18, 2017
|align=center|1
|align=center|4:14
|Las Vegas, Nevada, United States
|
|-
|Win
|align=center|7–0
|David Nuzzo
|KO (spinning wheel kick)
|LFA 11
|May 5, 2017
|align=center|1
|align=center|2:15
|Phoenix, Arizona, United States
|
|-
|Win
|align=center|6–0
|Irvin Veloz
|KO (punch)
|EB: Beatdown 20
|March 18, 2017
|align=center|1
|align=center|2:34
|New Town, North Dakota, United States
|
|-
|Win
|align=center|5–0
|Tycen Lynn
|KO (head kick)
|Intense Championship Fighting 26
|October 21, 2016
|align=center|2
|align=center|2:57
|Great Falls, Montana, United States
|
|-
|Win
|align=center|4–0
|Mark Coates
|Decision (unanimous)
|Intense Championship Fighting 23
|November 7, 2015
|align=center|3
|align=center|5:00
|Helena, Montana, United States
|
|-
|Win
|align=center|3–0
|Omar Avelar
|Submission (rear-naked choke)
|Intense Championship Fighting 20
|August 21, 2015
|align=center|1
|align=center|2:55
||Great Falls, Montana, United States
|
|-
|Win
|align=center|2–0
|Shane Sargent
|KO (punch)
|Intense Championship Fighting 19
|July 3, 2015
|align=center|1
|align=center|2:03
|Choteau, Montana, United States
|
|-
|Win
|align=center|1–0
|Josh Reyes
|TKO (punches)
|Intense Championship Fighting 17
|March 6, 2015
|align=center|1
|align=center|1:33
|Great Falls, Montana, United States
|

Professional boxing record 

{|class="wikitable" style="text-align:center; font-size:95%"
|-
!
!Result
!Record
!Opponent
!Method
!Round, time
!Date
!Location
!Notes
|- 
|1
|Win
|1–0
|align=left| David Courtney
|
|1 (4), 
|Jul 16, 2016
|align=left|
|

See also
List of current UFC fighters
List of male mixed martial artists

References

External links

 
 

Living people
1994 births
American male mixed martial artists
Bantamweight mixed martial artists
Mixed martial artists utilizing Brazilian jiu-jitsu
Mixed martial artists from Montana
People from Lewis and Clark County, Montana
Sportspeople from Helena, Montana
Doping cases in mixed martial arts
Ultimate Fighting Championship male fighters
American practitioners of Brazilian jiu-jitsu
American people of Irish descent
Twitch (service) streamers